The 2022 Formula Regional Asian Championship was a multi-event, Formula Regional open-wheel single seater motor racing championship. The championship featured a mix of professional and amateur drivers, competing in Formula Regional cars. It was the fifth season of the championship, and the first season under the Formula Regional moniker, after a rebrand happened due to the FIA ending the F3 category name.

The season was held over five consecutive weekends in January and February 2022.

For the first time, the second race of a weekend was a reversed-grid race, reversing the top 10 finishers of race one.

Arthur Leclerc won the drivers' championship with two races to spare, while his team, Mumbai Falcons India Racing, won the teams' championship. Pepe Martí, second overall, won the Rookie Cup, and Khaled Al Qubaisi earned Masters Cup honors.

Teams and drivers 

 Esteban Masson was scheduled to compete for BlackArts Racing, but did not appear in any rounds.

Race calendar and results 
The first proposal for the race calendar was announced on 21 September 2021. As the COVID-19 pandemic meant that most parts of Asia still were under heavy restrictions, the calendar only consisted of races in the United Arab Emirates for the second year in a row.

Season report 
The season started off at Yas Marina Circuit in Abu Dhabi, with Sebastian Montoya and Gabriele Mini sharing poles in qualifying. Montoya won the opening race, while multiple collisions behind him forced the race to end under the safety car. The second race was won by Gabriel Bortoleto, his maiden win in the FR category, remaining largely unchallenged as his biggest on-track rival, Isack Hadjar, retired halfway through the race. Race three saw a big crash at the start as Cem Bölükbaşı stalled on the grid and was hit by two other drivers, a collision heavy enough that the lengthy subsequent repairs on his car saw him withdraw from the championship. Gabriele Mini won the race, followed home by Jak Crawford and Hadjar. At the end of the first round, Mini led the standings by three points over Arthur Leclerc, with Montoya in third.

As the championship headed into its three-round Dubai leg, Montoya took pole again, this time sharing the achievement with Hadrien David. The latter overtook the former on lap three of the first race and then led home in a race where championship leader Mini had to retire late on due to a mechanical failure. The reverse-grid race two not only gave Leclerc his first win of the season as he passed polesitter Pierre-Louis Chovet, he also took the points lead to which he held on until the very end. Hadrien David won again in the third race of the weekend, his last race of the season as the Frenchman left the championship following round two. Poor results meant Mini dropped out of the championship top three, while leader Leclerc was nine and twelve points clear respectively of French duo David and Hadjar.

The circuit configuration was changed for the fourth round, but Montoya still prevailed in qualifying, accompanied by Dilano van 't Hoff. Montoya converted his race one pole into a win once again, heading a Mumbai Falcons 1-2-3 in a red-flagged race due to Francesco Braschi's engine blowing up halfway through. In race two, Dino Beganovic overtook four cars at the start and three more later to win from eighth place on the grid. Van 't Hoff wasn't able to hold on to his pole position, relinquishing the lead of the race to Pepe Martí, who was then overtaken for the win by Leclerc. The Monegasque now had a 35-point advantage over second-placed Martí, with Montoya in third, a further four points behind.

The fourth round of the championship saw multiple changes in the driver lineup, as many drivers elected to only take part in three rounds to keep their rookie status for championships in the same category later in the year. Estonian driver Paul Aron took double pole for the third and last Dubai event, but it was Hadjar who took the first race win, after the pair battled all race long. Braschi started from reverse grid pole in race two, but was passed at the start by Patrik Pasma. Jak Crawford overtook Oliver Bearman, who made his debut in round 4, in the last corner of the last lap, finishing in second place by a tenth of a second. Leclerc once again extended his championship lead after taking race three victory from Aron, he was 40 points ahead of Martí and Hadjar heading into the last round.

The championship returned to Abu Dhabi for its season finale, with Leclerc converting his race one pole into a dominant victory, claiming the drivers' championship in the process as Martí, the only other driver still in contention, had a horrible race and finished in 12th after dropping back to 23rd at one point. The penultimate race of the season was a chaotic one, with Mini taking a closely-fought win over Beganovic. Hadjar and Mini ended the championship with a Hitech 1-2 in the final race.

At the end of the season, Leclerc had amassed a 60-point advantage over his closest rival, although the very competitive Montoya, David and Mini didn't enter all rounds. Martí was the biggest surprise of the season as came second and took a dominant rookie title. The 2022 season saw grids climb to record highs for the championship, culminating at 29 entries for the season finale. The addition of a reversed grid for the second race meant more overtakes, and even the Masters Cup was reintroduced and won by Khaled Al Qubaisi, after there were no masters' entries in 2021. Mumbai Falcons India Racing took their first teams' championship in their second season of competition, over 80 points ahead of second place.

Championship standings

Scoring system 
Points were awarded to the top ten drivers.

Drivers' Championship

Rookie Cup

Masters Cup

Teams' Championship 
Ahead of each event, the teams nominated two drivers that accumulate teams' points.

Notes

References

External links 
 

FR Asia
FR Asia
FR Asia
FR Asia